Stanley P. McRae (August 13, 1919 – October 16, 1998) was an American football end in the National Football League for the Washington Redskins.  He played college football at Michigan State University and was drafted in the 17th round of the 1941 NFL Draft.

1919 births
1998 deaths
Players of American football from Michigan
American football wide receivers
Michigan State Spartans football players
Washington Redskins players